This is a list of African-American newspapers that have been published in Arkansas. The first such newspaper in Arkansas was the Arkansas Freeman of Little Rock, which began publishing in 1869.

Newspapers

See also 
List of African-American newspapers and media outlets
List of African-American newspapers in Mississippi
List of African-American newspapers in Missouri
List of African-American newspapers in Oklahoma
List of African-American newspapers in Tennessee
List of African-American newspapers in Texas
List of newspapers in Arkansas

Works cited

References 

Newspapers
Arkansas
African-American
African-American newspapers